Streetcars or trolley(car)s (North American English for the European word tram) were once the chief mode of public transit in hundreds of North American cities and towns. Most of the original urban streetcar systems were either dismantled in the mid-20th century or converted to other modes of operation, such as light rail. Today, only Toronto still operates a streetcar network essentially unchanged in layout and mode of operation.

Older surviving lines and systems in Boston, Cleveland, Mexico City, Newark, Philadelphia,  Pittsburgh, and San Francisco were often infrastructure-heavy systems with tunnels, dedicated right-of-way, and long travel distances. Most of these older their streetcar systems are largely rebuilt as light rail systems. About 22 North American cities, starting with Edmonton, Calgary and San Diego, have installed new light rail systems, some of which run along historic streetcar corridors. A few recent cases feature mixed-traffic street-running operation like a streetcar. Portland, Oregon, Seattle, and Salt Lake City have built both modern light rail and modern streetcar systems, while Tucson, Oklahoma City and Atlanta have built new modern streetcar lines. A few other cities and towns have restored a small number of lines to run heritage streetcars either for public transit or for tourists; many are inspired by New Orleans' St. Charles Streetcar Line, generally viewed as the world's oldest continuously operating streetcar line.

History

Omnibuses and horsecars

From the 1820s to the 1880s urban transit in North America began when horse-drawn omnibus lines started to operate along city streets. Examples included Gilbert Vanderwerken's 1826 omnibus service in Newark, New Jersey. Before long Omnibus companies sought to boost profitability of their wagons by increasing ridership along their lines.  Horsecar lines simply ran wagons along rails set in a city street instead of on the unpaved street surface as the omnibus lines used.  When a wagon was drawn upon rails the rolling resistance of the vehicle was lowered and the average speed was increased.

A horse or team that rode along rails could carry more fare paying passengers per day of operation than those that did not have rails. North America's first streetcar lines opened in 1832 from downtown New York City to Harlem by the New York and Harlem Railroad, in 1834 in New Orleans, and in 1849 in Toronto along the Williams Omnibus Bus Line.

These streetcars used horses and sometimes mules.  Mules were thought to give
more hours per day of useful transit service than horses and were especially popular in the south in cities such as New Orleans, Louisiana. In many cities, streetcars drawn by a single animal were known as "bobtail streetcars" whether mule-drawn or horse-drawn. In the nineteenth century Mexico had streetcars in around 1,000 towns and many were animal-powered. The 1907 Anuario Estadístico lists
35 animal-powered streetcar lines in Veracruz state, 80 in Guanajuato, and 300 lines in Yucatán.

Although most animal-drawn lines were shut down in the 19th century, a few lines lasted into the 20th century and later. Toronto's horse-drawn streetcar operations ended in 1891. New York City saw regular horsecar service last until 1917. In Pittsburgh, Pennsylvania, the Sarah Street line lasted until 1923.
The last regular mule-drawn cars in the United States ran in Sulphur Rock, Arkansas, until 1926 and were commemorated by a U.S. Postage Stamp issued in 1983. The last mule tram service in Mexico City ended in 1932, and a mule-powered
line in Celaya, survived until May 1954.

In the 21st century, horsecars are still used to take visitors along the  tour of the 3 cenotes from Chunkanán near Cuzamá Municipality in the state of Yucatán. Disneyland theme park in Anaheim, Cal., has operated a short horsecar line since it opened in July 1955. Similarly, Disney World theme park in Orlando has operated a short horsecar line since it opened in Oct 1971.  At both parks, they run from 8-9am to 1:30-2pm, and, depending on the season, sometimes 5-7pm.

Early power

During the nineteenth century, particularly from the 1860s to the 1890s, many streetcar operators switched from animals to other types of motive power.  Before the use of electricity the use of steam dummies, tram engines, or cable cars was tried in several North American cities.  A notable transition took place in Washington, D.C., in the U.S. where horsecars were used on street railways from 1862 to the early 1890s.  From about 1890 to 1893 cable drives provided motive power to Washington streetcars, and after 1893 electricity powered the cars.  The advantages of eliminating animal drive power included dispensing with the need to feed the animals and clean up their waste.  A North American city that did not eliminate its cable car lines was San Francisco and much of its San Francisco cable car system continues to operate to this day.

In this transition period some early streetcar lines in large cities opted to rebuild their railways above or below grade to help further speed transit.  Such system would become known as rapid transit or later as heavy rail lines.

Electrification
 
The World Cotton Centennial was held in New Orleans, Louisiana, from December 16, 1884, to June 2, 1885.
It featured displays with a great deal of electric light illumination, an observation tower with electric elevators,
and several prototype designs of electric streetcars.
Montgomery, Alabama, established its electric streetcar
system nicknamed the Lightning Route on April 15, 1886.
Another early electrified streetcar system in the United States was established
in Scranton, Pennsylvania, by November 30, 1886; it was the first system to be run exclusively on electric power, giving Scranton the nickname "The Electric City".
In 1887 an electric streetcar line opened between Omaha and South Omaha, Nebraska.
The Omaha Motor Railway Company began operation in 1888.

Along the east coast a large-scale electric street railway system known as the Richmond Union Passenger Railway was built by Frank J. Sprague in Richmond, Virginia, and was operating by February 2, 1888. The Richmond system had a large impact upon the burgeoning electric trolley industry.  Sprague's use of a trolley pole for D.C. current pick up from a single line (with ground return via the street rails) set the pattern that was to be adopted in many other cities.  The North American English use of the term "trolley" instead of "tram" for a street railway vehicle derives from the work that Sprague did in Richmond and quickly
spread elsewhere.

Los Angeles built the largest electric tramway system in the world, which grew to over 1600 km of track. A horse-drawn tramway was commenced in L.A. in 1872.  In the first decade of the 1900s, Henry Huntington was behind this development.  Trams ran in the city as well as to outlying settlements. Lines radiated from the city as far south as Long Beach. Cars could be coupled, running in multiple-unit operation.  All was abandoned by 1961.

Growth

By 1889 110 electric railways incorporating Sprague's equipment had been started or were planned on several continents.  By 1895 almost 900 electric street railways and nearly 11,000 miles (18,000 km) of track had been built in the United States.

The rapid growth of streetcar systems led to the widespread ability of people to live outside of a city and commute into it for work on a daily basis. Several of the communities that grew as a result of this new mobility were known as streetcar suburbs. Another outgrowth of the popularity of urban streetcar systems was the rise of interurban lines, which were basically streetcars that operated between cities and served remote, even rural, areas. In some areas interurban lines competed with regular passenger service on mainline railroads and in others they simply complemented the mainline roads by serving towns not on the mainlines.

The Hagerstown and Frederick Railway that started in 1896 in northern Maryland was built to provide transit service to resorts and the streetcar company built and operated two amusement parks to entice more people to ride their streetcars.  The Lake Shore Electric Railway interurban in northern Ohio carried passengers to Cedar Point and several other Ohio amusement parks.  The Lake Compounce amusement park, which started in 1846, had by 1895 established trolley service to its rural Connecticut location.  Although outside trolley service to Lake Compounce stopped in the 1930s, the park resurrected its trolley past with the opening of the "Lakeside Trolley" ride in 1997 which is still operating today as a short heritage line.  In the days before widespread radio listening was popular and in towns or neighborhoods too small to support a viable amusement park streetcar lines might help to fund an appearance of a touring musical act at the local bandstand to boost weekend afternoon ridership.

Many of Mexico's streetcars were fitted with gasoline motors in the 1920s and some were pulled
by steam locomotives. Only 15 Mexican streetcar systems were electrified in the 1920s.

Strikes 

Between 1895 and 1929, almost every major city in the United States suffered at least one streetcar strike.  Sometimes lasting only a few days, more often these strikes were "marked by almost continuous and often spectacular violent conflict," at times amounting to prolonged riots and civil insurrection.

Streetcar strikes rank among the deadliest armed conflicts in American labor union history.  Samuel Gompers of the American Federation of Labor called the St. Louis Streetcar Strike of 1900 "the fiercest struggle ever waged by the organized toilers" up to that point, with a total casualty count of 14 dead and about 200 wounded.  The San Francisco Streetcar Strike of 1907 saw 30 killed and about 1000 injured.  Many of the casualties were passengers and innocent bystanders.

The 1929 New Orleans streetcar strike was one of the last of its kind.  The rise of private automobile ownership took the edge off its impact, as an article in the Chicago Tribune observed as early as 1915.

Decline

The increased use of automobiles during the 1920s contributed to the decline of many streetcar lines in North America, and the decline continued during the Great Depression of the 1930s. The onset of World War II held off the closure of some streetcar lines as civilians used them to commute to war related factory jobs during a time when rubber tires and gasoline were rationed. After the war automobile use continued to rise and was assisted in the 1940s and 1950s by the passage of the  Trans-Canada Highway Act of 1948 and growth of provincial highways in Canada as well as the Federal Aid Highway Act of 1956 in the United States.

By the 1960s most North American streetcar lines were closed, with only the exceptions noted above and discussed below remaining in service.  During the same time all streetcar systems in Central America were scrapped as well. The survival of the lines that made it past the 1960s was aided by the introduction of the successful PCC streetcar (Presidents' Conference Committee car) in the 1940s and 1950s in all these cities except New Orleans.

City buses were seen as more economical and flexible: a bus could carry a number of people similar to that in a streetcar without tracks and associated infrastructure.  Many transit operators  removed some streetcar tracks but kept the electric infrastructure so as to run electrified trackless trolley buses.  Many such systems lasted only as long as the first generation of equipment, but several survive to the present.

Purported conspiracies

The abandonment of city streetcar systems in the mid-twentieth century led to accusations of conspiracy which held that a union of automobile, oil, and tire manufacturers shut down the streetcar systems in order to further the use of buses and automobiles.  The struggling depression-era streetcar companies were bought up by this union of companies who, over the following decades, dismantled many of the North American streetcar systems.

While it is true that General Motors, Firestone Tire, Standard Oil of California, Phillips Petroleum, and some other companies funded holding companies that purchased about 30 more of the hundreds of transit systems across North America, their real goal was to sell their products — buses, tires, and fuel — to those transit systems as they converted from streetcars to buses. During the time the holding companies owned an interest in American transit systems, more than 300 cities converted to buses. The holding companies only owned an interest in the transit systems of less than fifty of those cities. GM and other companies were subsequently convicted in 1949 of conspiring to monopolize the sale of buses and related products via a complex network of linked holding companies including National City Lines and Pacific City Lines. They were also indicted, but acquitted of conspiring to monopolize the ownership of these companies. The former verdict was upheld on appeal in 1951.

Renaissance

Light rail

The systems described in the paragraphs above and below are genuine streetcars or tramways, with smaller vehicles and mixed-traffic street running (i.e. no separation from other vehicles), such as those in New Orleans and San Francisco. However, a greater number of North American cities have built light rail systems in recent decades, some of which operate partially in the right-of-way of city streets, but which mostly operate in exclusive rights-of-way. A few North American 'light rail' systems date to the "first" streetcar era, such as Boston's Green Line, Cleveland's Blue and Green Lines, Mexico City's Xochimilco Light Rail, and the light rail system in Newark, New Jersey, and so can be considered "holdovers" or "legacies" from that era.

The term light rail was devised in 1972 by the Urban Mass Transportation Administration (UMTA; the precursor to the U.S. Federal Transit Administration) to describe new streetcar transformations which were taking place in Europe and being planned in North America. Some notable distinctions between light rail systems and their streetcar predecessors were that:
 Light rail lines may run at least partially along exclusive rights of way instead of only along or in streets (i.e. without street running).
 A light rail line is more likely to run multiple unit trains instead of single cars.
 A light rail line may use high level platforms instead of in street level stops. These design differences mean that light rail systems tend to have higher passenger capacities and higher speeds than their streetcar predecessors.

The pioneering "modern" North American light rail system, Edmonton Light Rail Transit, was started in Edmonton in 1974 and became operational on April 22, 1978 – it used mostly European technology, did not use street running, and operated in tunnels in the downtown area (which accounted for much of the high expense of building that system). It was soon followed by light rail systems in San Diego and Calgary in 1981 that used similar vehicles but which avoided the expense of tunnels by using surface alignments and, on a few sections, even partial street running, in reserved lanes (restricted to transit vehicles only). The development of light rail systems in North America then proliferated widely after 1985, mostly in the United States, but also in Canada and Mexico. Including streetcars, light rail systems are operating successfully in over 30 U.S. cities, and are in planning or construction stages in several more.

Heritage and modern streetcars
New public transit streetcar services also returned, at least in the United States, around the same time as the emergence of the new light rail transit.

Prior to 2001, the new streetcar systems that opened in North America for public transit were so-called heritage streetcar systems, alternatively known as "vintage trolley" or "historic trolley" lines. While Detroit and Seattle were the first cities to open heritage lines in 1976 and 1982, their heritage lines ultimately closed in 2003 and 2005, respectively. The first heritage system to be successful was Dallas' M-line which opened in 1989. Memphis opened what ultimately became a larger heritage streetcar system in 1993, while San Francisco restored one of its defunct streetcar lines (F Market & Wharves) using heritage streetcar operations in 1995. These heritage systems were followed in the 2000s by new heritage streetcar lines in Kenosha, Tampa, and Little Rock, and the restoration of a defunct streetcar line using heritage streetcars in Philadelphia (SEPTA Route 15) in 2005. Other cities in both the United States and Canada opened new heritage streetcar lines that operated only on weekends or seasonally, primarily as tourist services, and so didn't provide true "public transit" service.

Truly modern streetcar systems arose in the United States, starting in 2001, in Portland, Oregon. This was followed by new streetcar lines in Seattle, Salt Lake City, Tucson, and Atlanta. These systems were completely new in every way, operating on new track built specifically for them, and operating with "modern" streetcar vehicles rather than the "heritage" vehicles used in places like Dallas, Memphis and San Francisco.

Transportation vs. development
In 2015, the Mineta Transportation Institute released a peer-reviewed research report which used key informant interviews to examine the experiences on modern-era streetcars operating in Little Rock, Memphis, Portland, Seattle, and Tampa. The research revealed that in these cities, the primary purpose of the streetcar was to serve as a development tool (in all cities examined), a second objective was to serve as a tourism-promoting amenity (in Little Rock and Tampa), and transportation objectives were largely afterthoughts with the notable exception of Portland, and to a lesser degree, Seattle.

Surviving first-generation streetcar systems

Not all streetcar systems were removed after World War II. The San Francisco cable car system and New Orleans' streetcars are the most famous examples of the survival of a "legacy" streetcar system in the United States to the present day. In addition to New Orleans' streetcars, Toronto's conventional electric streetcar system also avoided abandonment, as did portions of the streetcar systems in San Francisco, Boston, Newark, Philadelphia, Pittsburgh, and Cleveland, as well as Mexico City. The Newark, Philadelphia, and Boston systems run into subways downtown, while the Pittsburgh and San Francisco systems have tunnels under large hills that had no acceptable road alternatives for bus replacements.  The St. Charles Avenue line in New Orleans runs down the park-like "neutral ground" in the center of St. Charles Avenue, while the surviving Xochimilco line in Mexico City, the interurban lines in Cleveland, and almost all of the above-ground portions of the Boston system have similar rights-of-way, and, thus, are generally treated as "light rail" lines in modern contexts rather than as "streetcar" lines.  The only electric system to survive without using these alternatives to street running was Toronto's.

The surviving legacy systems using PCC streetcars have since replaced their PCC cars with modern light rail vehicles, although restored vintage PCC cars are still in regular operation on Boston's Ashmont-Mattapan High Speed Line, and as well as on San Francisco's restored F Market heritage line. New Orleans' streetcar system also continues to operate a few surviving Perley Thomas cars (along with replica cars). All of the other legacy systems have received new equipment and most have upgraded to modern light rail vehicles.

Some of these cities have also rehabilitated lines, and Newark, New Orleans, and San Francisco have added trackage and new lines in recent years; San Francisco also restored a streetcar line with heritage service in 1995 (see Heritage streetcar systems section, below). In Philadelphia, a former trolley line (SEPTA Route 15, aka. the Girard Avenue Line), that was "bustituted" in 1992, resumed trolley service in 2005 using rebuilt historic cars (see below); two other former Philadelphia trolley lines have been proposed for a resumption in trolley service in the 2010s though such plans have stalled.

In Canada, most cities once had a streetcar system, but today the Toronto Transit Commission (TTC) is the only traditional operator of streetcars, and maintains the Western Hemisphere's most extensive system in terms of track length, number of cars, and ridership. The city has added two new streetcar lines in recent years (510 Spadina in 1990, and 509 Harbourfront in 2000), and is upgrading its other lines. Its traditional fleet of CLRVs and ALRVs were replaced by the newer Bombardier Flexity low-floor models, and expansion is planned in combination with the city's plans for the rejuvenation of its waterfront.

The table below lists the surviving first-generation "legacy" streetcars in those nine North American cities:

Notes

Second-generation streetcar systems

Newly built systems using modern streetcars have so far only opened in cities in the United States, and are summarized in the table below (listed in order of opening):

United States

In 2001, Portland, Oregon, which already had a successful light rail system (MAX), became the first city in the North America in more than 50 years to open a new streetcar system served by modern vehicles, with the opening of the Portland Streetcar. It uses low-floor cars built in the Czech Republic, but the system's first U.S.-assembled streetcar was delivered in 2009.  The line serves as a downtown circulator between the central city core, the Pearl District and Northwest Portland, Portland State University, and in 2005 was extended to the South Waterfront district, a new mixed-use development along the Willamette River shoreline. Running almost entirely on streets and without any separation from other traffic on most sections, it complements the MAX light rail system, which covers much longer distances and serves as a regional, higher-capacity rail system for the metropolitan area.  The MAX system also runs along streets in central Portland, but is separated from traffic (other than buses) even in those areas, via reserved light-rail-only lanes. Construction of a second streetcar line, to the city's east side, began in 2009, and the new line opened in September 2012.

The new Portland system and several of the new heritage streetcar systems have been intended, in part, as a way of influencing property development in the corridors served, in such a way as to increase density while attracting residents interested in relatively car-free  living.  The Portland Streetcar is considered to have been very successful in this regard.

The second "second-generation" streetcar system opened in North America was in 2007, in Seattle, where the city's transportation department led the project to construct the South Lake Union Streetcar, but contracted with local transit authority King County Metro to operate the service.  Connecting the neighborhood south of Lake Union with the transit core of downtown Seattle, it operates every 15 minutes and is served by three low-floor streetcars of the same type as some of those in Portland.  Residents of the area began referring to the system as the "South Lake Union Trolley" giving it the amusing but unfortunate acronym of "SLUT". A line serving First Hill opened in January 2016 and feeds Central Link, the light rail system that opened in 2009. Construction of an extension that will connect the two lines is set to begin in early 2018.

A new rail line which opened in Tacoma, Washington in 2003, Tacoma Link, is sometimes referred to as a streetcar line because of its short length and use of single vehicles (rather than trains) of the same type as the low-floor streetcars used in Portland. However, the line is separated from other traffic over most of its length, making it a light rail line, which is what its operator (Sound Transit) considers it to be.

In development
Some 70 U.S. cities have studied the idea of bringing back streetcars as transit, although to date the number that have come to fruition has been small.  In the 2000s, one factor in this was lack of funding support for streetcar development from the Federal Transit Administration (FTA) under the Bush Administration. However, under the Obama Administration, the FTA indicated it would provide funding for streetcar projects in cities interested in building new systems.

Under construction

The following table lists the new modern streetcar systems that are currently under construction:

The systems listed above will use modern streetcars.  For new heritage streetcar systems that are under construction, see relevant section below.

Planned or proposed
In addition to the streetcar systems currently under construction, a number of additional streetcar systems are in the planning stages in the United States.

Examples of cities with streetcar systems in the active planning stages include Los Angeles, New York City, Sacramento, Saint Paul, and Omaha.

Heritage streetcar systems

Heritage streetcar systems are sometimes used in public transit service, combining light rail efficiency with tourists' nostalgia interests. Proponents claim that using a simple, reliable form of transit from 50 or 100 years ago can bring history to life for 21st century visitors.

Prior to 2001, the new streetcar systems that opened in North America had been heritage lines, alternatively known as vintage trolley or 'historic' trolley lines.  Several cities built new heritage streetcar lines, starting from the 1980s onward. Some heritage systems operate only with limited hours, and/or only on weekends, or seasonally, and thus are simply tourist- or history-oriented excursion services. Other heritage systems operate daily, running throughout the entire day, year-round, thus providing true public transit service.

New heritage streetcar systems providing daily, year-round service included ones opened in Seattle (the Waterfront Streetcar – opened in 1982, but closed in 2005), Galveston (1988, service suspended in 2008 after Hurricane Ike), but reopened in 2021, Dallas (McKinney Avenue Transit Authority) (1989), Memphis (1993) and Kenosha, Wisconsin (2000).  Other new heritage streetcar lines have opened in Tampa in 2002 and Little Rock in 2004.  All of these were newly constructed systems, but all have been served by historic streetcars or replicas of historic streetcars.  The El Paso Streetcar is a new heritage system that opened in November 2018, using six restored PCC streetcars that have survived from the city's previous streetcar system, which closed in 1974, but serving a new route.

Systems offering regular public transit
The following two tables list all of the currently operating heritage streetcar systems offering regular public transit service:

Closed systems

The heritage Detroit Downtown Trolley in Detroit, Michigan operated from 1976 until 2003.  The Detroit trolley faced a steep decline in ridership after the Detroit People Mover system was installed in 1987. The carbarn for the former narrow gauge trolley was demolished in 2004, and the tracks have subsequently been removed.
The Waterfront Streetcar in Seattle, Washington, was a heritage line that operated from 1982 until 2005, when the line's carbarn was demolished to make room for the Olympic Sculpture Park.
Operations on the Galveston Island Trolley heritage system, suspended since September 2008, due to extensive damage caused by Hurricane Ike, were restarted on October 1, 2021, running on Fridays, Saturdays and Sundays from 10:00 a.m. to 7:00 p.m.
Vancouver, British Columbia had the Vancouver Downtown Historic Railway which was a tourist-based heritage system that opened in 1998 and which used to operate on weekends and holidays from May to mid-October; however, the system closed in 2012, most likely permanently. 
The Waterfront Red Car in the San Pedro section of Los Angeles, California, was a heritage line that operated from 2003 until closure in 2015 due to the realignment of Sampson Way leading into Ports O' Call Village. Restoring trackage was deemed cost prohibitive.
Operations on the tourist-oriented heritage River Street Streetcar in Savannah, Georgia have been suspended since 2016, officially on a temporary basis and due to interfering construction works. It is unclear when, if ever, the service will resume.
From 2015 to July 2019, the CityLynx Gold Line in Charlotte operated with replica heritage streetcars sourced from the former Charlotte Trolley. The streetcars were withdrawn from service in July 2019, and will be retired and sold after their replacement with modern vehicles in early 2021.
Other tourist-oriented heritage trolley systems that have closed are the Charlotte Trolley (1996–2010), the Portland Vintage Trolley (1991–2014), the Whitehorse Waterfront Trolley (2000–2019), and the Old Pueblo Trolley (1993–2011) in Tucson, Arizona.

List of primarily tourist heritage systems in North America

The following table lists primarily tourist-oriented heritage streetcar systems (i.e. systems not designed primarily for public transit – and thus heritage systems that often operate only seasonally):

Museums

Unlike a heritage system, a streetcar museum may offer little or no transport service.  If there are working streetcars in a museum's collection, any service provided may be seasonal, not follow a schedule, offer limited stops, service only remote areas, or otherwise differ from a regularly scheduled heritage line. Some North American streetcar museums include:

 Arizona Street Railway Museum in Phoenix, Arizona
 Baltimore Streetcar Museum in Baltimore, Maryland
 Canadian Railway Museum between Delson and Saint-Constant, Quebec
 Chattanooga Choo Choo complex in Chattanooga, Tennessee
 Connecticut Trolley Museum in East Windsor, Connecticut
 East Troy Electric Railroad Museum in East Troy, Wisconsin
 Electric City Trolley Museum in Scranton, Pennsylvania
 Fort Edmonton Park in Edmonton, Alberta
 Fox River Trolley Museum in South Elgin, Illinois
 Halton County Radial Railway in Rockwood, Ontario
 Hesston Steam Museum in Heston, Indiana
 Historic Pensacola's Museum of Commerce in Pensacola, Florida
 History Park at Kelley Park in San Jose, California
 Illinois Railway Museum in Union, Illinois - collection now includes general railroad equipment as well as streetcars
 Issaquah Valley Trolley in Issaquah, Washington
 Lowell National Historical Park in Lowell, Massachusetts
 Midwest Electric Railway in Mt. Pleasant, Iowa
 Minnesota Streetcar Museum in Minneapolis, Minnesota operates heritage lines such as the Como-Harriet Streetcar Line
 Museo de Transportes Eléctricos del D.F., of STE, in Mexico City
 National Museum of Transportation in St. Louis, Missouri
 National Capital Trolley Museum in Colesville, Maryland
 New York Museum of Transportation in Rush, New York
 Northern Ohio Railway Museum in Chippewa Lake, Ohio
 North Texas Historic Transportation in Fort Worth, Texas
 Old Pueblo Trolley in Tucson, Arizona
 Orange Empire Railway Museum in Perris, California - collection now includes general railroad equipment as well as streetcars
 Oregon Electric Railway Museum in Brooks, Oregon
 Pennsylvania Trolley Museum in Washington, Pennsylvania
 Rockhill Trolley Museum in Rockhill Furnace, Pennsylvania
 Roundhouse Railroad Museum in Savannah, Georgia
 San Francisco Cable Car Museum in San Francisco, California
 San Francisco Railway Museum in San Francisco, California
 Seashore Trolley Museum in Kennebunkport, Maine
 Shelburne Falls Trolley Museum in Shelburne Falls, Massachusetts
 Shore Line Trolley Museum in East Haven, Connecticut
 Trolley Museum of New York in Kingston, New York
 Western Railway Museum in Suisun City, California
 Yakima Electric Railway Museum in Yakima, Washington

See also

General articles

 Interurban
 Light rail in North America
 Streetcar suburb
 Streetcar Railway Post Office

System lists

 List of street railways in Canada
 List of town tramway systems in Central America (all-time)
 List of town tramway systems in North America (all-time)

 List of streetcar systems in the United States (all-time)
 List of North American light rail systems by ridership
 List of United States light rail systems by ridership

 List of rail transit systems in the United States (current systems only; list is not limited to streetcar/tram systems)
 List of tram and light rail transit systems (world list of current systems)

Specific systems

Operating

 Blue and Green Lines (Cleveland) is composed in part of streetcar lines upgraded to light-rail
 Streetcars in Boston
 Cincinnati Bell Connector
 Streetcars in Kenosha, Wisconsin
 Streetcars in Mexico City
 Streetcars in New Orleans

 Philadelphia: SEPTA Subway-Surface Trolley Lines, SEPTA Route 15, SEPTA Routes 101 and 102
 Portland Streetcar
 San Francisco Municipal Railway
 Seattle Streetcar
 Toronto streetcar system

Not operating

 Albuquerque Traction Company
 Streetcars in Atlanta
 Streetcars in Cincinnati
 Streetcars in Cleveland
 El Paso Electric Railway Company
 Johnstown Traction Company
 Key System
 Lackawanna and Wyoming Valley Railroad
 Los Angeles Railway
 Los Angeles Pacific Railroad

 Lehigh Valley Transit
 Ottawa Electric Railway
 Pacific Electric Railway
 San Diego Electric Railway
 Toledo, Port Clinton and Lakeside Railway
 Twin City Rapid Transit
 Streetcars in Washington, D.C.
 Waterfront Streetcar in Seattle

Car builders and types

Structures

Standing

 Bay E, West Ankeny Car Barns (Portland, Oregon)
 Beardsley Zoo
 Callowhill Depot
 College Park Trolley Trail
 Comfort Station (Milton, Massachusetts)
 East New York Yard bus depot is a former trolley depot
 East Side Trolley Tunnel
 Georgetown Steam Plant
 Guelph Transit stone carbarn at 371 Waterloo Avenue
 Hagerstown and Frederick Railway#Surviving landmarks
 Harvard (MBTA station)
 Inman Park
 Little York Pavilion
 Myrtle Avenue Streetcar 'subway' Jacksonville, FL. took the JTCO cars under the terminal Company tracks.
 Newton Street Railway Carbarn

 Pacific Electric Building
 Pacific Electric Railroad Bridge
 Pacific Electric Railway Company Substation No. 8
 Pacific Electric Sub-Station No. 14
 Park Avenue Tunnel (roadway) 1834 cut was used by NY&H streetcars
 Portland Railway, Light and Power Sellwood Division Carbarn Office and Clubhouse
 Streetcar Depot, West Los Angeles
 South Decatur Trolley Trail
 Terminal Arcade
 Trolley Square
 Union Street Railway Carbarn, Repair Shop
 Watts Station
 West Philadelphia Streetcar Suburb Historic District
 Wychwood Barns

Not standing

 Culver Depot formerly stood on Coney Island
 Duquesne Gardens
 Newark Public Service Terminal

 Silk Centre
 Temescal, Oakland, California#History

Notes

References

External links

American Public Transportation Association (APTA) Streetcar Subcommittee
APTA Streetcar and Heritage Trolley Site

 
Passenger rail transportation in North America
Articles containing video clips